During the evening of June 22, 2007, a powerful F5 tornado struck the town of Elie, in the Canadian province of Manitoba ( west of Winnipeg). The tornado was unusual because it caused the extreme damage during its roping out stage at a mere  in width and moved extremely slowly and unpredictably. The tornado tracked primarily southeast, as opposed to the usual northeast, and made multiple loops and sharp turns. Because Environment Canada adopted the Enhanced Fujita scale in 2013, there will be no more tornadoes with an F5 rating, making this tornado the first and last confirmed F5 tornado in Canada.

While several houses were leveled, no one was injured or killed by the tornado. A home in the town was swept clean off of its foundation, justifying the F5 classification. One of the strongest twisters on record since 1999, it is one of only ten to be rated F5/EF5 since 1999 in North America. The tornado caused damage of an estimated $39 million.

Meteorological synopsis 

The synoptic situation on June 22 was conducive to a major severe weather event in southern Manitoba. A low pressure system came in from Saskatchewan through the day, and then moved over southern Manitoba throughout the evening. A warm front was positioned north of Elie for much of the day with a trailing cold front residing west of Elie near the Lake Manitoba basin southwest through southeast Saskatchewan. A lake breeze boundary was also present south of Lake Manitoba.

Very warm air was situated over Southern Manitoba that day as temperatures climbed into the high 20s °C (low 80s °F). Strong wind shear was present, reflected in high helicity values. These conditions were favorable for supercells, which are thunderstorms with rotating updrafts, and they developed within the warm sector located in the Red River Valley and areas farther west. The situation was exacerbated by the presence of the lake breeze boundary because the atmosphere was capped through much of the day with little in the way of a trigger. This boundary provided the focus for storms to develop rapidly and become severe, given the high instability present.

Storm track and damage 

The tornado initially touched down north of the Trans-Canada Highway around 6:25 p.m. CDT (23:25 UTC) and slowly moved southeast where it picked up a tractor-trailer. The tornado made another turn south and made an extremely slow loop over the town's flour mill at F2 intensity, causing over $1 million in damage. From there, it headed south, parallel to Janzen Road, at F0 intensity. After reaching the intersection of Jansen Road and Road 61 North, the tornado turned east directly towards the southwest edge of Elie. It quickly intensified to F4 strength while it made a loop over Elie Street. Here, it destroyed four houses, including one which was described as well-built and bolted to its foundation, being lifted completely off its foundation and thrown into the air where it then broke apart, justifying F5 intensity. The tornado also preceded to flip and throw multiple cars, and even tossed one homeowner's Chrysler Fifth Avenue onto a neighbor's roof. The tornado lingered over this area of Elie for approximately four minutes before it exited Elie to the southwest and rapidly dissipated. 

The tornado repeatedly struck essentially the same area of town, destroying most of the structures and vehicles in the area. A video of the tornado shows an entire two-story home swiped off its foundation and tossed  in the air before rotating around the tornado and then being obliterated. Also seen on the video was a three-quarters-of-a-ton GM van filled with drywall picked up and tossed hundreds of feet. At least three houses are seen being destroyed on the video, with many more being damaged as well as vehicles, and the mill is seen being damaged, with bins and roofs being destroyed there.

Aftermath 
Since the people in Elie were prepared and took the necessary precautions during the event, no one was injured or killed during the storm. The following day, Environment Canada sent out a storm damage survey team from the Prairie and Arctic Storm Prediction Centre to assess the damage caused by the tornado. On September 18, 2007, the tornado was upgraded to F5 on the Fujita scale from the original F4 based on video analysis of the tornado and reassessment of the damage. This was the first tornado in Canada to be officially rated as such, making it the strongest confirmed tornado in Canadian history. It was one of only two F5/EF5 tornadoes that year (the other being in Greensburg, Kansas on May 4, 2007), and there have only been ten confirmed since 1999. At the time, Canada had not adopted the Enhanced Fujita scale.

Rating disputes 
Many people argued that the tornado was only being rated an F5 for novelty's sake, but further research found clear F5 damage with a single house being wiped cleanly off its foundation. Surveyors were hesitant to rate the tornado so high because its peculiar slow forward speed could mean that it was a less intense tornado that stood still over the same area for a long period of time, and that it hadn't reached F5 intensity. This uncertainty resulted in the tornado's initial F4 rating. Analysis of civilian video however, found the tornado crossed F5-damaged area for no more than 30 seconds, making it a clear F5-intensity tornado.

Significance 
At the same time as the Elie tornado, another tornado was occurring close to nearby Oakville. That tornado was rated as an F3 with winds of  after it destroyed several outbuildings and many trees. The Elie tornado was also significant because of how it looked while at F5 intensity. The tornado was reaching the end of its life span and was in its roping out/decaying stage. Some meteorologists suggest the intensity was due to the rapid implosion of the tornado's wind field, which caused it to quickly accelerate for a brief period of time.

Other tornadoes
In addition to the Elie F5 tornado, four more tornadoes also affected Canada on June 22–23.

See also
 Tornadoes of 2007
 List of Canadian tornadoes and tornado outbreaks
 List of F5 and EF5 tornadoes
 Tornado outbreak of May 4–6, 2007 – Produced the Greensburg, Kansas EF5 tornado

Notes

References

External links

 Video of tornado
 Popular Manitoba tornado video
 The Elie, Manitoba F5 Tornado

E
E
E
E
Elie
June 2007 events in North America
2007 disasters in Canada
2007--6-22